Laisana Likuceva (born 3 February 1999) is a Fijian rugby sevens player. She competed in the women's tournament at the 2020 Summer Olympics. She won a bronze medal at the event.

References

External links

1999 births
Living people
Female rugby sevens players
Olympic rugby sevens players of Fiji
Rugby sevens players at the 2020 Summer Olympics
Medalists at the 2020 Summer Olympics
Olympic bronze medalists for Fiji
Olympic medalists in rugby sevens
Place of birth missing (living people)
Fiji international women's rugby sevens players